This is a list of the Australian moth species of the family Sesiidae. It also acts as an index to the species articles and forms part of the full List of moths of Australia.

Sesiinae
Carmenta mimosa Eichlin & Passoa, 1984
Chamaesphecia mysiniformis (Boisduval, 1840)
Ichneumenoptera chrysophanes (Meyrick, 1886)
Ichneumenoptera commoni (Duckworth & Eichlin, 1974)
Ichneumenoptera xanthogyna (Hampson, 1919)
Melittia chalybescens Miskin, 1892
Melittia doddi Le Cerf, 1916
Nokona carulifera (Hampson, 1919)
Nokona coracodes (Turner 1922)
Pseudosesia isozona (Meyrick, 1886)
Pseudosesia oberthuri (Le Cerf, 1916)
Pseudosesia zoniota (Turner, 1922)
Pyropteron doryliformis (Ochsenheimer, 1808)
Synanthedon cupreifascia (Miskin, 1892)
Synanthedon tipuliformis (Clerck, 1759)
Trilochana smaragdina Diakonoff, 1954

Tinthiinae
Oligophlebia eusphyra (Turner, 1917)
Oligophlebia igniflua (T.P. Lucas, 1893)
Tinthia xanthospila Hampson, 1919

External links 
Sesiidae at Australian Faunal Directory
Sesiidae at Australian Insects

Australia